On Your Own may refer to:

 "On Your Own" (Blur song), 1997
 "On Your Own" (The Verve song), 1995
 "On Your Own", a song by Jorja Smith from Lost & Found, 2018
 "On Your Own", a 1986 song by Pete Shelley
 "On Your Own (The Land Before Time)", a song from the film The Land Before Time VI: The Secret of Saurus Rock
"On Your Own", a 1984 song by Billy Squier featured in Giorgio Moroder’s restoration of the film Metropolis

See also 
 On My Own (disambiguation)
 On Our Own (disambiguation)